People's Welfare Front (PWF) was a Tamil-Nadu political alliance formed in October 2015. It consisted of four political parties : Marumalarchi Dravida Munnetra Kazhagam (MDMK), Viduthalai Chiruthaigal Katchi (VCK), Communist Party of India (CPI) and Communist Party of India (Marxist) (CPI-(M)). The alliance contested the 2016 Tamil Nadu and Puducherry legislative assembly elections as one unit. The alliance rejected potential alliance with Indian National Congress, BJP, DMK or ADMK, while hopeful of enlisting and TMC (G.K.Vasan) and Puthiya Thamizhakam.

In early November the alliance led movements against price rise, atrocities against minorities and Dalits and efforts to curtail freedom of speech. It has taken a strong position in favour of liquor prohibition in Tamil Nadu. Later it made an electoral alliance with DMDK and Tamil Maanila Congress.

Policies 
The alliance consists of one Dravidian party (MDMK) and one Tamil party (VCK) and  two leftist parties (CPI and CPI(M)). People's Welfare Front released a Common Minimum Program which all parties agreed to. The major features of the program are as below.

 Oppose globalisation, liberalisation economic policies and stop the privatisation of state programmes and industries
 Oppose Hindutva, religious extremism and religious prosecution
 Oppose powers exploiting caste – work to pass stricter laws preventing violence and discrimination against Dalits
 Oppose corruption – implement Lokayukta
 Implement transparent government – information about laws and programs will be released online
 Increase funding and support for local governance units – implement Right to Public Services legislation in Tamil Nadu
 Stop the stealing of minerals
 Promote social justice – preserve 69% reservation, expand reservation in the private sector
 Mother tongue development – make multilingual education ("first-language-first") mandatory
 Promote folk arts – establish a university to develop folk arts
 Work for increase powers and funding for states
 Work to resolve river water issues
 Support Sri Lankan Tamils in pursuit of justice and rights
 Law and order – prevent police brutality
 Protect democratic rights – fully protect freedom of expression
 Prohibition – fully implement liquor prohibition in Tamil Nadu
 Development of agriculture and villages – provide funding and infrastructure services for farmers
 Land – protect arable land
 Irrigation – maintain and modernise major irrigation systems
 Homes and homelessness – provide homes for all without homes
 Promote crafts and small businesses
 Electricity – make Tamil Nadu self-sufficient in producing electricity
 Labour rights – introduce minimum wage of  15,000 per month
 Education – prevent privatisation of education and develop competitive public educational systems
 Health – allocate 6% to health; create a multi-purpose public medical training facility in each district
 Environment – implement stricter environmental standards
 Employment – fill the two lakhs vacancies without corruption
 Elimination of poverty – correctly identify people below poverty line (BPL) and deliver welfare services to them
 Rural employment scheme – increase wages given under rural employment guarantee
 City people – provide safe drinking water, develop underground sewage system
 Women welfare – ensure that the state women commission works effectively and reports the results in the state assembly
 Fishing communities welfare – stop multi-national companies (MNCs) from using sea resources; provide pensions to fishers
 Minority rights – take strong actions against Hindutva religious violence and hate speech
 Civil service and teachers – make part-time and shift workers permanent
 Democratic reform – recommend proportional representation; work for 50% reservation for women in elected offices
 Inflation – stop online and future trading activities
 Public distribution – provide basic necessities including fruits and vegetables at subsidised prices
 Science and Technology – build a central science and technology advanced research centre in southern Tamil Nadu
 Sports – Make exercise mandatory for all levels until class 12
 Transportation – Increase number of buses to reduce congestion
 Road accidents – Separate traffic by building dividers

References 

Political parties in Tamil Nadu
Defunct political party alliances in India
2015 establishments in Tamil Nadu
Political parties established in 2015
2019 disestablishments in India
Political parties disestablished in 2019